is a 1988 Japanese film directed by Yōjirō Takita. It is also known as The Yen Family in America, as well as Famille Yen in France. It stars Takeshi Kaga and Kaori Momoi. It is a comedy about a family and their obsession for making money.

Cast
Takeshi Kaga as Hajime Kimura
Kaori Momoi as Noriko Kimura
Hiromi Iwasaki as Terumi Kimura
Mitsunori Isaki as Taro Kimura
Akira Emoto as Shinichi Amemiya
Yutaka Ikejima as Manager

References

External links
 

1988 films
Japanese comedy films
1980s Japanese-language films
Films directed by Yōjirō Takita
1988 comedy films
1980s Japanese films